One More Tomorrow is a 1946 American film directed by Peter Godfrey and written by Charles Hoffman and Catherine Turney (additional dialogue by Julius J. Epstein and Philip G. Epstein) from the play The Animal Kingdom by Philip Barry. The film, starring Ann Sheridan, Dennis Morgan, Jack Carson, Alexis Smith, Jane Wyman and Reginald Gardiner, is a remake of the 1932 film The Animal Kingdom. It was released by Warner Bros. on June 1, 1946.

Plot
Wealthy socialite Tom Collier (Dennis Morgan) is bored by his father's aspirations for him and by his elitist crowd, except for old friend Pat Regan (Jack Carson), who serves as his butler. When Tom meets commercial photographers Christie Sage (Ann Sheridan) and Frankie Connors (Jane Wyman), he purchases a failing liberal activist magazine in order to work with Christie and be near her. Tom begins to find himself among Christie's bohemian friends, although his father does not approve. Christie eventually refuses Tom's proposal of marriage and leaves for Mexico to pursue her photography as a fine artist.

During her absence, the rebounding Tom marries gold-digging and manipulative Cecelia Henry (Alexis Smith), who plans to mold him to her own wishes. Christie returns from Mexico, realizing that she has made a mistake and that she loves Tom, but it's too late. Cecelia schemes to separate Tom from Christie, from his old friend Pat, from his magazine work, and finally- conspiring with Tom's father- from his principles. Tom must decide whether to publish an exposé on corrupt defense contractors which will compromise many of his rich friends. With Pat's help, Tom decides to move forward with the story and leave Cecelia for his 'real wife', Christie.

Cast  
 Ann Sheridan as Christie Sage
 Dennis Morgan as Thomas Rufus 'Tom' Collier III
 Jack Carson as Patrick 'Pat' Regan
 Alexis Smith as Cecelia Henry
 Jane Wyman as Frankie Connors
 Reginald Gardiner as James 'Jim' Aloysius Fisk
 John Loder as Owen Arthur
 Marjorie Gateson as Aunt Edna Collier
 Thurston Hall as Thomas Rufus Collier II
 John Abbott as Joseph Baronova
 Marjorie Hoshelle as Illa Baronova
 Sig Arno as Poppa Diaduska

Production
Olivia de Havilland, citing overwork, refused to appear in this film and was suspended by Warner Bros. She soon filed a lawsuit which resulted in a landmark ruling known as the De Havilland Law.

Box office
According to Warner Bros records the film earned $2,358,000 domestically and $659,000 foreign.

References

External links 
 
 
 
 

1946 films
Warner Bros. films
American comedy films
1946 comedy films
Films directed by Peter Godfrey
American black-and-white films
1940s English-language films
1940s American films